Sophia  Di Martino (born 15 November 1983) is an English actress known for portraying Sylvie in the Marvel Cinematic Universe television series Loki.

Early life and education
Di Martino was born in Nottingham and grew up in the suburb of Attenborough. She is half Italian. She attended Chilwell Comprehensive School, where she completed an A Level in performing arts. She went on to graduate with a Bachelor of Arts with honours in media and performance from the University of Salford.

Career
Di Martino works in television, film, theatre, and music. In Channel 4's Flowers, she plays Amy Flowers. She plays Eva in the 2016 feature film The Darkest Universe. She appeared as Amber in the third series of Sky's Mount Pleasant and as Emma, the girlfriend of Simon Bird's character Adam, in the first episode of series three of Channel 4's Friday Night Dinner. She also appeared in the third series of 4 O'Clock Club in 2014 as Miss Parkwood and in the 2015 film Royal Day Out.

She was a regular cast member of Casualty, playing the role of Pauline "Polly" Emmerson from 19 March 2009 until 30 April 2011.

In 2018, she appeared in Click & Collect (2018). In 2019, she was cast as Sylvie in the Disney+ show Loki. Di Martino won Best Breakthrough Performance and Best Team with Tom Hiddleston and Owen Wilson at the 2022 MTV Movie & TV Awards.

Personal life
Since 2009, Di Martino has been in a relationship with actor and writer Will Sharpe, with whom she has two children, born in 2019 and 2021.

Selected filmography

Film

Television

Awards and recognition

References

External links

 

People from Attenborough, Nottinghamshire
Alumni of the University of Salford
English television actresses
1983 births
Living people
English people of Sicilian descent
English people of Italian descent
Actresses from Nottinghamshire
21st-century English actresses
English film actresses